The Bozeman Daily Chronicle is a daily newspaper published in Bozeman, Montana.

Founded in 1883, the paper was originally a weekly. Since 1996, the Chronicle has been published each morning, and its first Saturday edition was published in 1997. The paper converted to a morning publication with a new design in April 1996. Owner Pioneer News Group sold its papers to Adams Publishing Group in 2017.

It is noted by many of its residents and non-residents to have an entertaining Police Reports section, which include "many minor crimes of a more humorous or absurd nature". In 2011, they published a book We Don't Make This Stuff Up a compilation of over 30 years of some of these crimes.

Notes

External links

Bozeman Daily Chronicle

Newspapers published in Montana
Publications established in 1883
1883 establishments in Montana Territory
Daily newspapers published in the United States